Lagos State University Teaching Hospital popularly known as LASUTH is a state-owned teaching hospital in Lagos, Nigeria, attached to the Lagos State University. It is in Ikeja – the state's capital.

LASUTH also shares structures with the College of Medicine, Lagos State University. The hospital was established in 1955 from a small cottage health centre by the Old western region. It was converted to a teaching hospital in July 2001.

Achievements
On 12 November 2015 the first successful kidney transplant was performed in the hospital.

References

Hospitals established in 1955
Hospitals in Lagos